Eithne Tháebfhota ("of the Long Side") was one of the daughters of the king Cathaír Mór. According to the Irish mythology, she was described as the queen of two kings of different generations.

Queen of Ireland 
In most Old Irish writing, she is the wife of Conn Cétchathach. Her marriage was thought beneficial to the kingdom ; until her death the fields gave three harvests a year, showing that she was a form of the goddess of Sovereignty.

Esnada Tige Buchet 
In The Melodies of Buchet's House, Eithne was in fosterage to Buchet when her numerous brothers came and stole his cattleherds. Buchet forced to leave his house, with his wife and Eithne. They lived in a small hut, at the forest of Kells, when she met her future husband, Cormac mac Airt, Conn's grandson. She spends a night with him, to conceive Cairbre Lifechair.

Echtrae Cormaic 
In The Adventure of Cormac, she also appears to be Cormac's wife.

Family tree

Sources 
Extrait of "Eithne Tháebfhota on Oxford Index"

References 

Cycles of the Kings
Fenian Cycle
Irish women
Year of birth unknown
Year of death unknown